Gaynsky District (Gajna rajon) is an administrative district (raion) of Komi-Permyak Okrug of Perm Krai, Russia; one of the thirty-three in the krai. As a municipal division, it is incorporated as Gaynsky Municipal District. It is located in the northwest of the krai. Its administrative center is the rural locality (a settlement) of Gayny. Population:  The population of Gayny accounts for 29.9% of the district's total population.

Geography and climate
Major rivers flowing through the district include the Kama and its tributary the Veslyana. Other significant rivers are the Chyornaya, the Timshor, and the Lupya.

Climate is temperate continental with long and cold winters. In the north of the district, pine forests dominate, comprising about 50% of the total forested area, while in the south spruce forests are more common.

History
The district was established on September 15, 1926.

Demographics
The Komi-Permyak people are the aboriginal population. The population is concentrated along the Kama, the Veslyana, and the Chyornaya Rivers.

Ethnic composition (as of the 2002 Census):
Russians: 56.5%
Komi-Permyak people: 34%
Tatars: 3.7%

Economy
The economy of the district is based on timber industry. There are also dairy and brick factories and a mechanical-repair plant in Gayny. Arable lands make up less than 1% of the total district's area.

Transportation
Gayny is connected by roads with Kudymkar and Syktyvkar; there are no bus station in the settlement, and the only bus stop is in its center. The Kama River plays a significant role in transportation.

References

Notes

Sources

Districts of Perm Krai
Komi-Permyak Okrug
States and territories established in 1926